Samsung Heavy Industries Co., Ltd. (Korean: 삼성중공업) is one of the largest shipbuilders in the world and one of the "Big Three" shipbuilders of South Korea (including Hyundai and Daewoo). Geoje (in Gyeongsangnam-do) is one of the largest shipyards in the world, having 3 dry docks and 5 floating docks. A core subsidiary of the Samsung Group, South Korea's largest conglomerate, SHI's main focus is on the engineering, procurement, construction, commissioning and the delivery of: transportation ships for the commercial industry, topsides modules, drilling and floating production units for the oil and gas sector, gantry cranes for fabrication yards, digital instrumentation and control devices for ships, and other construction and engineering services.

SHI operates manufacturing facilities at home and abroad, including ship block fabrication factories in Ningbo and Rongcheng, China. The Geoje Shipyard in particular, SHI's largest shipyard in South Korea, boasts the highest dock turnover rate in the world. Mostly ultra-large ships are built at this dock, having the world's highest production efficiency with yearly dock turnover rate of 10 and the launch of 30 ships per year.

SHI specializes in the building of high added-value and special purpose vessels, including LNG carriers, off-shore related vessels, oil drilling ships, FPSO/FSO's, ultra Large container ships and Arctic shuttle tankers. In recent times SHI has concentrated on LNG tankers and drillships.

History 
Samsung Heavy Industries was established in 1974, when the company's Changwon plant was opened. SHI soon purchased Woojin, followed by the construction of Geoje shipbuilding facilities and merger with Daesung Heavy Industries.

Samsung Shipbuilding and Daesung Heavy Industries were merged under Samsung Heavy Industries in 1983. Since then, it has put efforts in the introduction of new technologies and development of products, while expanding the business area into heavy equipment and construction.

Since the 21st century, SHI began to build LNG and large passenger ships in earnest, and exported shipbuilding technologies to the United States.  Samsung Heavy Industries decided to advance into the cruise ship market, the last remaining stronghold of EU shipbuilders. The company stated entering the undertaking was necessary to maintain its number one position in the global shipbuilding market. In 2009, SHI was contracted to build a new residential cruise ship named Utopia, which will be the largest passenger ship ever assembled in Asia. The ship will test the waters by 2016.

Vehicle production
Starting in the late 1980s, SHI produced forklifts and heavy equipment (mainly excavators) at Changwon. The forklift production was established through agreements with Clark Material Handling Company (production started in 1986) and the heavy equipment production came from the construction equipment division of Korea's Heavy Industries and Construction, acquired by Samsung in 1983 (SHI began manufacturing heavy equipment in 1987). Truck production was added in May 1993. The company also assembled electric car prototypes. The truck production business was spun off in 1996 as a separate company called Samsung Commercial Vehicles. The forklift and heavy equipment businesses were sold off in 1998.

Wind turbine manufacture
Samsung Heavy Industries has been involved in wind turbine manufacture including the S7.0-171 turbine, which in 2013 was the world's largest wind turbine. It is still one of the most powerful turbines on Earth.

See also 
 Economy of South Korea
 List of Korean companies
 List of shipbuilders and shipyards
 Seocho Samsung Town
 Samsung Heavy Industries Rugby Club

References

External links 
 
 
 Samsung Heavy Industries, Power & Control Systems Division website
 Samsung Global website

Heavy Industries
Shipbuilding companies of South Korea
Wind turbine manufacturers
Manufacturing companies based in Seoul
Manufacturing companies established in 1974
Vehicle manufacturing companies established in 1974
South Korean companies established in 1974
Companies listed on the Korea Exchange
South Korean brands